Egbert of Liège, in , was an 11th-century educator and author, working at the cathedral school in Liège (in what is now Belgium). His main work, produced around 1023, is an educational collection entitled Fecunda Ratis ("The Richly Laden Ship"), divided into two parts, the "Prora" (Prow), containing proverbs and classical and secular stories, and the "Puppis" (Poop deck) with extracts from biblical and patristic writers. The collection contains the earliest known precursor of the Little Red Riding Hood story, entitled "". A critical edition of the Fecunda Ratis by Ernst Voigt was published in the series Monumenta Germaniae Historica in 1889. An English translation by Robert Gary Babcock has been published as book 25 in the Dumbarton Oaks Medieval Library (Harvard University Press, 2013). An extract describes the origins of the red riding hood:

References

External links
Scans of Voigt edition at Internet Archive.

Year of birth unknown
Year of death unknown
Writers from Liège
11th-century Latin writers
11th-century people of the Holy Roman Empire